Leonardo Donaggio (born 23 September 2003) is an Italian freestyle skier.

He competed in the big air at the 2022 Winter Olympics.

References

External links

2003 births
Living people
Italian male freestyle skiers
Freestyle skiers at the 2022 Winter Olympics
Olympic freestyle skiers of Italy
21st-century Italian people